Bucsum is the Hungarian name for three villages in Romania:

Bucium village, Șinca Commune, Braşov County
Bucium village, Orăştioara de Sus Commune, Hunedoara County
Bucium-Orlea village, Sântămăria-Orlea Commune, Hunedoara County